Filip Chipchev (born 15 July 1985) is a Bulgarian footballer, currently playing as a forward for FC Oborishte.

References

External links
 

1985 births
Living people
Bulgarian footballers
First Professional Football League (Bulgaria) players
Association football forwards
FC Chernomorets Burgas players
PFC Rodopa Smolyan players
FC Spartak Plovdiv players
FC Lyubimets players
Place of birth missing (living people)